Tsu (hiragana: つ, katakana: ツ) is one of the Japanese kana, each of which represents one mora.

The small kana っ/ッ, known as sokuon, are identical but somewhat smaller. They are mainly used to indicate consonant gemination and commonly used at the end of lines of dialogue in fictional works as a symbol for a glottal stop.

The dakuten forms づ, ヅ, pronounced the same as the dakuten forms of the su kana in most dialects (see yotsugana), are uncommon. They are primarily used for indicating a voiced consonant in the middle of a compound word (see rendaku), and they can never begin a word.

In the Ainu language, it can be written with a handakuten (which can be entered into a computer as either one character (ツ゚) or two combined characters (ツ゜) to represent the sound , which is interchangeable with the katakana ト゚.

The katakana form has become popular as an emoticon in the Western world due to its resemblance to a smiling face and as part of a "shrug" emoticon, known alternatively as Shruggie, rendered as:  ¯\_(ツ)_/¯ .

ヅァ, ヅェ and ヅォ are used in gairaigos; these pronunciations are not same as ズァ (zwa), ズェ (zwe) and ズォ (zwo).

Stroke order

Other communicative representations

 Full Braille representation

 Computer encodings

See also 

 Sokuon
 Dakuten and Handakuten
 Kanji
 Chōonpu

References

Specific kana